CPEB, or cytoplasmic polyadenylation element binding protein, is a highly conserved RNA-binding protein that promotes the elongation of the polyadenine tail of messenger RNA. CPEB most commonly activates the target RNA for translation, but can also act as a repressor, dependent on its phosphorylation state. In animals, CPEB is expressed in several alternative splicing isoforms that are specific to particular tissues and functions, including the self-cleaving Mammalian CPEB3 ribozyme. CPEB was first identified in Xenopus oocytes and associated with meiosis; a role has also been identified in the spermatogenesis of Caenorhabditis elegans.

CPEB is involved in closed-loop regulation of mRNAs that keeps them inactive. The closed-loop structure between the 3'UTR and 5'UTR inhibits translation.  This has been observed in Xenopus laevis in which eIF4E bound to the 5' cap interacts with Maskin bound to CPEB on the 3' UTR creating translationally inactive transcripts. This translational inhibition is lifted once CPEB is phosphorylated, displacing the Maskin binding site, allowing for the polymerization of the PolyA tail, which can recruit the translational machinery by means of PABP. However, it is important to note that this mechanism has been under great scrutiny.

Role in memory
Drosophila Orb2 binds to genes implicated in long-term memory. An isoform of CPEB found in the neurons of the sea slug Aplysia californica, as well as in Drosophila, mice, and humans, contains an N-terminal domain not found in other isoforms that shows high sequence similarity to prion proteins. Experiments with the Aplysia isoform expressed in yeast reveal that CPEB has a key property associated with prions: it can cause other proteins to assume alternate protein conformations that are heritable in successive generations of yeast cells. Furthermore, the functional RNA-binding form of the CPEB protein may be the prion-like state. These observations have led to the suggestion that long-lasting bistable prionlike proteins play a role in the formation of long-term memory.
It has been suggested that "both memory storage and its underlying synaptic plasticity are mediated by the increase in. . .CPEB."

Interactions
CPEB has been shown to interact with the following proteins:
 PUM2
 PARN
 GLD-2
 symplekin
 eIF4E binding protein

References

RNA-binding proteins
Neuroscience of memory